Olanu is a commune located in Vâlcea County, Muntenia, Romania. It is composed of six villages: Olanu, Casa Veche, Cioboți, Drăgioiu, Nicolești and Stoicănești.

References

Communes in Vâlcea County
Localities in Muntenia